Silent Honor is a novel written by Danielle Steel, published in 1996. The plot follows Hiroko, an eighteen-year-old who leaves Japan to live with her uncle in California, United States, after making a difficult decision based on her needs and her father's beliefs. However, when Pearl Harbor is bombed, she becomes an enemy in the American community. The book was published by Delacorte Press.

Plot summary
In August, 1941, Hiroko visits the United States from Japan, as she has an uncle, aunt, and cousins living there. Upon first arrival, she settles in well and continues to lead a regular life, however, on December 7, 1941 — Pearl Harbor is bombed, thus making them an enemy in their community and across the USA, as they are considered foreigners. Ordered to stay by her father, she remains occupied in California, however, the military are ordered to remove all Japanese citizens, and she ends up being put in a detention centre, having to fight to stay alive.

List of characters

Hiroko Takashimaya
Eighteen-year-old Japanese girl who visits California for studying at St. Andrew's College for a year just before Japan's Pearl Harbor attack

Peter Jenkins
Colleague of Takao at Stanford University who befriends Hiroko

Takeo Tanaka
A cousin of Hiroko's father, who is a professor at Stanford University in California

Masao Takashimaya
Hiroko's father who teaches at Kyoto University

Yuji Takashimaya
Hiroko's younger brother in Japan

Anne Spencer
Hiroko's roommate at St. Andrew's dormitory

Reception
Publishers Weekly comments about the book that "Steel's slapdash prose and stereotypical characterization produce a formulaic tale, albeit more earnest and didactic than her usual fare".

Footnotes

1996 American novels
American romance novels
Historical romance novels
Novels by Danielle Steel
Novels set in California
Novels set during World War II
Fiction set in 1941
Delacorte Press books